Kordula Striepecke (born 25 April 1963 in Erfurt) is a German slalom canoeist who competed from the late 1980s to the late 1990s. She won four medals at the ICF Canoe Slalom World Championships with a gold (K1 team: 1997) and three bronzes (K1: 1991, 1995; K1 team: 1995).

Striepecke also competed in two Summer Olympics, earning her best finish of sixth in the K1 event in Barcelona in 1992.

She won the overall World Cup title in 1993. She also earned 2 medals at the European Championships (1 silver and 1 bronze).

World Cup individual podiums

References

1963 births
Canoeists at the 1992 Summer Olympics
Canoeists at the 1996 Summer Olympics
German female canoeists
Living people
Olympic canoeists of Germany
Sportspeople from Erfurt
Medalists at the ICF Canoe Slalom World Championships